Caspicosa is a genus of spiders in the family Lycosidae. It was first described in 2007 by Ponomarev. , it contains 2 species.

References

Lycosidae
Araneomorphae genera
Spiders of Asia
Spiders of Russia